Estonian Artists Association (abbreviated EAA) is organization which connects artists in Estonia. EAA primary functions are "participating in cultural policymaking and sectoral development activities, protecting the interests of artists, curators, art historians and theorists as well as other art workers, and promoting their working conditions".

President of EAA is Elin Kard.

Every year EAA organizes Annual Exhibition of Estonian Artists' Association.

EAA precursors were Central Association of Estonian Artists (established 1922), Estonian Soviet Artists Association (1943) and the Artists Association of the Estonian SSR (1957).

EAA has several suborganizations, eg Estonian Painters' Association ('Eesti Maalikunstnike Liit').

References

External links

Non-profit organizations based in Estonia
Arts in Estonia
Estonian artist groups and collectives